Reg Nicholls may refer to:
 Reg Nicholls (footballer)
 Reg Nicholls (athlete)